Arothron meleagris, commonly known as the guineafowl puffer or golden puffer, is a pufferfish from the Indo-Pacific, and Eastern Pacific. It is occasionally harvested for the aquarium trade. It reaches 50 cm in length.

Guineafowl puffers have heavy rounded bodies that are uniformly black with numerous small white spots (black puffer or botete negro), bright yellow spots (golden puffer or botete dorado) or a mixture of the two morphologies with bright yellow spots and black patches. They have large blunt heads with short snouts and are equipped with a set of massive teeth. They have small and similarly shaped anal and dorsal fins that are well back on their body. Their caudal fin base is long and deep and their caudal fin is rounded. Their body is covered with small denticles that resemble coarse sandpaper.
When this fish is scared or frightened, they inflate and make themselves larger, exposing the denticles.

Physical Characteristics 
The most extensive study done of the color patterning of Arothron meleagris is by Jinxiang and Tyler in 1986. In this study, A. meleagris has three distinctive color variations. The first most common color variation that it possesses is a background color consisting of dark brown with many white, and much less commonly, black or dark brown, spots on its whole body. The spots located on the rear of A. meleagris are more minuscule compared to the spots on its sides, a characteristic that is especially prevalent on those that are located in the Indian Ocean. A majority of the specimens of A. meleagris have pale fins that are dark brown in color with white spots not unlike to the ones found on its body. Additionally, the width of its pectoral fin can vary differently for each pufferfish, with some possessing a dark brown color on the bottom base half of the pectoral fin.

Another color variation it possesses that is as common is a yellow background color covered with black spots around its body. In regards to its fins, Jinxiang and Tyler note that "The distal edges of the dorsal, anal, and pectoral fins are whitish, while more basally these fins are yellow, with the rays light brownish toward the more distal portion of the basal region.". Additionally, the caudal fin is either yellow or a mix of yellow and light brown, with the areas near its gills having a light brown color.

The third color variation is a mix of the two patterns. A portion of A. meleagris''' back in the third color variation is brown in color, scattered with unique white spots while its sides, belly  and head are yellow in color covered with several black spots There are light brown patches on its mouth, gill openings and on the bottom bases of the dorsal and caudal fins, both of which are covered with white spots. The color yellow also makes up its anal and pectoral fins, with a light brown color covering its rays. Some of the other instances of the third color variation include the heads and bodies of A. meleagris being bright yellow in color while its fins are covered in brown and scattered with white spots.

In a study done by Jinxiang and Tyler, with around 124 specimens of A. meleagris examined, 79% of them are found to possess the first pattern, with 11% having the third pattern and 10% of them being found to have the second pattern. Based on the sample size, the study indicates that the first pattern is the most common color variation found in them, followed by the third and then the second pattern being the rarest.

Apart from the three most common color variations, there exists several other rarer color patterns found in A. meleagris. In a report done by Hector Reyes Bonilla and Arturo Hernandez-Velasco an abnormal specimen of  A. meleagris was found at Cabo Pulma Reef, in the southwestern gulf of California, Mexico. White spots, a common characteristic across the bodies of the Arothron meleagris, was not found in the abnormal specimen. Instead, the specimen displayed a color variation of white lines across a black-purple background Other features of the specimen include a circular black line around its eye, a black belly and a white reticula. Additionally, its posterior area contained a white line while both its dorsal and anal fin had black stripes over a yellow background.

Since A. meleagris belongs to the Tetradontids family, it has a tough skin that is enveloped in minuscule spiked scales, a beak-like dental plate separated by a median line, and a gill opening similar to an incision anterior to the pectoral fin's base.Allen and Erdmann 2012, as cited in Shao et al., 2014 It also has the ability to create and store toxins like tetrodotoxin and saxitoxin in its liver, gonads and skin. The level of toxicity also differs depending on the season and geographic location that it is located in. Additionally, among its members in Tetradontids family, A. meleagris have the smallest vertebrate genomes that have been discovered so far.

 Habitat and Population Arothron meleagris is highly abundant within the Indian Ocean and the eastern Pacific Ocean reefs while being less commonplace on the rocky reefs of the eastern Pacific  While its population saw a large increase from 1987 to 2002 in Costa Rica, it may be decreasing due to the destruction of its habitats.  

Additionally, the marine aquarium trade may also have contributed to the decrease in the population of A. meleagris'.  This is because it is considered a high-priced product in the marine aquarium trade.

The destruction of the coral reefs, which functioned as A. meleagris habitat and source of food, has caused its population to decline. Starting from 2008, 15% of the coral reefs in the globe faced a hazard of getting to be "effectively lost", meaning that 90% of the corals were in no position to recover. Thus, with a portion of coral reef species being damaged and lost, the population of this species may start to decline.

In a report done by Jinxiang and Tyler, A. meleagris can be found in the following locations: Mombasa in Kenya, Comoro Isls., Aldabra Atoll, Seychelles Isls., Chagos Archipelago, Cocos-Keeling Isls., Indonesia, Philippines, South China Sea, Ryukyu Isls., Guam Isl., Marshall Isls., Gilbert Isls., Howland Isls., Fiji, Caroline Isls., Samoa, Hawaiian Isls., Easter Isl., Clarion lsl., Revilla gigedo Isls., Clipperton Isl., Galapagos Isls., Gorgona Isl., Bahia Pinas of Panama, Bahia Solana of Colombia, and La Plata lsl. of Ecuador.Arothron meleagris is also located among Taiwan and the South China Sea's coasts. Additionally, it can be found from the Guaymas, Mexico to Ecuador while not being found in the East-Indian area with the exception of the Christmas Island. A. meleagris can also be found in huge abundance within seafaring islands, residing at depths from 3–24 metres.

Outside of its natural habitats, it can be found in aquarium companies as well as retail shops and sold for a substantial fee. Overall, it still a very common species and has a steady population as it is listed as a species of Least Concern by the IUCN Red List of Threatened Species

 Ecology and Behaviour Arothron meleagris is similar to Arothron hispidus, as it is also known to be a very solitary species of pufferfish. This is because A. hispidus usually rests during the night, often found swimming below ledges and fissures on Kona reefs and amidst boulders and corals during the day. It also wards off predators by inflating its body to expand its size, thereby making it less at risk of being eaten.Arothron meleagris is thought to get its thrust from synchronised lateral oscillations of its dorsal and anal fins, which it uses to drive themselves through the water. When A. meleagris swims forward at a constant level and velocity, its body's long axis will be angled upwards at an angle of 3-10 degrees from its horizontal. Additionally, the angles of incidences of the Arothron meleagris for specific patterns remained constant and did not increase nor decrease regardless of its moving speed. While the body of A. meleagris will be shaped like a prolate spheroid when its body is not moving, it will start to misshapen when its swimming speed increases. Any irregularities in its body will often be restricted to its antero-ventral profiles. On the other hand, the body shape will be like its form when it's floating or at rest on low swimming speeds. Whenever the puffer fish's swimming speed increases, its anterior ventral area is compressed with a pointed apex ventral to its pectoral fins. Regarding the change to this species' body in relation to its speed, Gordon, Plaut, & Kim  state that "at 2·0–2·5 BL -1 the fish increased the gape of the mouth widely enough to reveal their sharp, broad incisor teeth which projected forward"

While the diet of this species mainly consists of corals and invertebrates such as tunicates, crustose coralline algae, sponges and echinoids, it also varies according to the number of corals within different reefs, such as La Azufrada. In some areas, it acts as a passive generalist, eating corals that are dependent on their abundance, while in others, it acts as an active generalist, increasing its dietary preferences by only consuming uncommon corals.

Coral reefs are one of the most common foods that this species feeds on as they greatly assist with their growth. The availability of food types may affect its diet. This is due to the fact that the predation pressure applied by A. meleagris may rise or fall as the overall population of its prey shifts.  

A study done by Guzman, Hector M., and D. Ross Robertson in 1989 shows that the diet variations of A. meleagris depend on its food availability. An example is the diet of this species at Caño Island. It was shown in the study that the 1985 red tides at Caño Island had a huge impact on the Pocillopora, a coral species that it feeds heavily on, growing there, greatly decreasing its population. As a result, A. meleagris switched its feeding habits, consuming Crustose coralline algae, a food that is plentiful but inferior in quality to the Pocillopora. This species was then observed to switch to a more healthy diet consisting of the next most available coral, Porites. The pufferfish then developed a strong preference for the Porites as a food source.

In addition to corals, several other foods were eaten by this species. At Caño Island, algae was a major part of its diet as they continuously fed on it even with the abundance of corals. On the other hand, A. meleagris rarely consumes algae at the Uva and Secas reefs, preferring to ÷eat corals instead. At the Panamanian locations and at Cocos island, this species acted as a passive generalist while at Caño island, it behaved like an active generalist.

Thus, the feeding preferences and habits for A. meleagris differ greatly, being dependent on many factors such as its location and food availability.

 Trade and Use Arothron melagris is traded in the aquarium trade and between 1967 and 2003, 3,813 individuals were exported throughout the state, with a total value of $8,069.7. Specimens of A. meleagris can also be purchased for $199.95–$399.99 in the aquarium trade. The yellow coloured variations of this species are particularly important, with prices reaching US$500.ReefHotSpot.com 2011, as cited in Shao et al. 2014

 Effects on Coral Population Arothron meleagris has been known to consume a large amount of coral reefs within several regions and islands such as Gorgona Island.  In a study conducted by Guzman and Lopez, A. meleagris may restore a select number of coral species such as Pocillopora, located in Cano island, if it is able to adjust its feeding habits. On the other hand, it can hinder the recovery of several eastern Pacific Reefs if it continues on consuming rare corals.

Fortunately, such mass consumption may not come to fruition. Guzman and Lopez noted that rare coral species found in Gorgona Island remain uneaten by A. meleagris due to its inactive behaviour as well as the fact that it directs its eating habit in specific locations within the reef where only a mass amount of single species of coral is available. As a result, it may aid the restoration of coral reefs when consuming specific coral species such as Pocillopora and Psammocora'', both of which are found in the lower sections of the reefs. Guzman and Lopez both noted that such restoration of the coral reefs is due to fragmentation and dispersion: "Coral dispersion and fragmentation have been found to be an important aspect of the recovery of Panamanian and Costa Rican Reefs".

Notes

References 

 Allen, G.R. and Erdmann, M.V. 2012. Reef Fishes of the East Indies. Tropical Reef Research, Pearth, Australia.
Allen, G.R. and Randall, J.E. 1977. Review of the Sharpnose Pufferfishes (subfamily Canthigasterinae) of the Indo-Pacific. Records of the Australian Museum 30(17): 475–517.
BlueZooAquatics.com. (2011). Guinea Fowl Pufferfish.
 Bussing, W.A. 1995. Tetraodontidae. Tamboriles, tamborines, botetes, peces globo, corrotuchos. FAO, Rome.
 Cortés, J., Jiménez, C.E., Fonseca, A.C., Alvarado, J.J. (2010). Status and conservation of coral reefs in Costa Rica. Revista de Biologia Tropical, 58(1), 33–50.
 Fishery Bulletin. (n.d.). United States: Scientific Publications Office, National Marine Fisheries Office, NOAA. Fishery Bulletin, 72(4), 1012–1013.
 Gordon, M. S., Plaut, I., & Kim, D. (1996). How puffers (Teleostei: Tetraodontidae) swim. Journal of Fish Biology, 49(2), 319–328. https://doi.org/10.1111/j.1095-8649.1996.tb00026.x
 Guzman, Hector M., and D. Ross Robertson. (1989) "Population and feeding responses of the corallivorous pufferfish Arothron meleagris to coral mortality in the eastern Pacific." Marine ecology progress series, 55(2), 121–131. 
 Guzmán, Héctor M., and Juan D. López. (1991). "Diet of the corallivorous pufferfish Arothron meleagris (Pisces: Tetraodontidae) at Gorgona Island, Colombia." Revista de biología tropical, 39(2), 203–206.
 Jinxiang Su, & Tyler, J. (1986). Diagnoses of Arothron nigropunctatus and A. meleagris, Two Extremely Polychromatic Indo-Pacific Pufferfishes (Pisces: Tetraodontidae). Proceedings of the Academy of Natural Sciences of Philadelphia, 138(1), 14–32. Retrieved March 12, 2021, from http://www.jstor.org/stable/4064849
Neafsey, D.E. and Palumbi, S.R. 2003. Genome size evolution in pufferfish: a comparative analysis of Diodontid and Tetraodontid pufferfish genomes. Genome Research 13(5): 821–830.
ReefHotSpot.com. (2011). Golden Puffer Hawaiian 5–7 in. (Arothron meleagris)
 Reyes-Bonilla, Hector, and Arturo Hernandez-Velasco. (2017):. "Color pattern anomaly of the spotted pufferfish Arothron meleagris (Bloch & Schneider, 1801) in the Gulf of California, Mexico." Cah. Biol. Mar, 58, 207–211.
 Shao, K., Liu, M., Jing, L., Hardy, G., Leis, J.L. & Matsuura, K. (2014). Arothron meleagris. The IUCN Red List of Threatened Species 2014: e.T193662A2255983. https://dx.doi.org/10.2305/IUCN.UK.2014-3.RLTS.T193662A2255983.en.
 Su, J., Li, C. 2002. Fauna Sinica: Osteichthyes: Tetraodontiformes, Pagasiformes, Gobiesociformes, Lophiiformes. Science Press, Beijing.
Walsh, W.J., Cotton, S.S.P., Dierking, J. and Williams, I.D. (2003). The Commercial Marine Aquarium Fishery in Hawaii. In: A.M. Friedlander (ed.), Status of Hawaii's Coastal Fisheries in the New Millennium. The American Fisheries Society Hawaii Chapter.
Wellington, G.M. (1982). Depth Zonation of Corals in the Gulf of Panama: Control and Facilitation by Resident Reef Fishes. Ecological Monographs, 52(3), 223–241.

External links
 Fishes of Australia : Arothron meleagris
 

meleagris
Fish of Hawaii
Marine fish of Northern Australia
Fish of Mexican Pacific coast
Western Central American coastal fauna
guineafowl puffer